Bijeqin (also Romanized as Bījeqīn, Bijaqīn, and Bayjaqīn; also known as Bidzhin and Bījgīn) is a village in Howmeh Rural District, in the Central District of Khodabandeh County, Zanjan Province, Iran. At the 2006 census, its population was 1,025, in 199 families.

References 

Populated places in Khodabandeh County